Each year the Indiana Miss Basketball award is given to the person chosen as the best high school girls basketball player in the U.S. state of Indiana.

Award winners

Schools with multiple winners

See also
Indiana Mr. Basketball award

References

Mr. and Miss Basketball awards
High school sports in Indiana
Women's sports in Indiana
Lists of people from Indiana
Lists of American sportswomen
American women's basketball players
Basketball players from Indiana
Miss Basketball